The Passing of Hell's Crown is a 1916 American silent Western film featuring Harry Carey.

Cast
 Harry Carey as Blaze
 Olive Carey as Rose Graney (credited as Olive Fuller Golden)
 G. Raymond Nye as Chuck Wells (credited as Bill Nye)
 Neal Hart as Sheriff Bill Graney
 Hoot Gibson as the Cowboy
 Peggy Coudray as the Cowboy's Sweetheart

Reception
Like many American films of the time, The Passing of Hell's Crown was subject to cuts by city and state film censorship boards. For example, the Chicago Board of Censors required a cut of the branding of cattle, seven shooting scenes between the sheriff and outlaws, and the shooting of Chuck by Blaze.

See also
 Harry Carey filmography
 Hoot Gibson filmography

References

External links
 

1916 films
1916 short films
1916 Western (genre) films
American silent short films
American black-and-white films
Films directed by Jacques Jaccard
Silent American Western (genre) films
1910s American films